{{Infobox scientist
| name              = Max Valier 
|image = Max Valier AWS 3002.jpg
|caption = Valier as depicted in Air Wonder Stories, February 1930.
| birth_date        = 
| birth_place       = Bolzano, County of Tyrol, Austria-Hungary
| death_date        =  
| death_place       = Berlin, Weimar Republic
| nationality       = Austrian
| fields            = Physics
| alma_mater        = University of Innsbruck
}}

Max Valier (9 February 1895 – 17 May 1930) was an Austrian rocketry pioneer. He was a leading figure in the world's first large-scale rocket program, Opel-RAK, and helped found the German Verein für Raumschiffahrt (VfR – "Spaceflight Society") that would bring together many of the minds that would later make spaceflight a reality in the 20th century.

Biography
Valier was born in Bozen in the County of Tyrol (now South Tyrol) and in 1913 enrolled to study physics at the University of Innsbruck. He also trained as a machinist at a nearby factory. His studies were interrupted by the First World War, during which he served in the Austro-Hungarian army's air corps as an aerial observer.

After the war, Valier did not return to his studies, but became a freelance science writer. In 1923, he read Hermann Oberth's landmark book Die Rakete zu den Planetenräumen (The Rocket into Interplanetary Space) and was inspired to write a similar work to explain Oberth's ideas in terms that could be understood by lay persons. With Oberth's assistance, he published Der Vorstoß in den Weltenraum (The Advance into Space) the following year. It was an outstanding success, going through six editions before 1930. He followed this with numerous articles on the subject of space travel, with titles like "Berlin to New York in One Hour" and "A Daring Trip to Mars".

In 1928 and 1929, he worked with Fritz von Opel on a number of rocket-powered cars and aircraft within the world's first large-scale rocket program Opel-RAK. For von Opel, these experimentations had also a very positive public relations effect for the Opel company, and for Valier, they were a way of further raising interest in rocketry amongst the general population. Friedrich Sander in these endeavours was chosen as the supplier of solid-fuel rocket motors. Valier's and von Opel's activities led to land and rail vehicle speed records, and eventually to the world's first rocket plane. The first public flight took place on September 30, 1929, piloted by von Opel. After the Opel RAK.1 flight, caused by the Great Depression, the Opel RAK collaboration came to an end, von Opel left Germany in 1930, immigrated to the US and eventually to France and Switzerland. Valier then continued the rocket development on his own.

By the late 1920s, the VfR was focusing its efforts on liquid-fuelled rockets. Their first successful test firing with liquid fuel (five minutes) occurred in the Heylandt plant on 25 January 1930. On 19 April 1930 Valier performed the first test drive of a rocket car with liquid propulsion, the Valier-Heylandt Rak 7.

Valier was killed less than a month later when an alcohol-fuelled rocket exploded on his test bench in Berlin.  His protégé Arthur Rudolph went on to develop an improved and safer version of Valier's engine.

Memorials
Max Valier is still remembered in South Tyrol as one of the most famous inventors and scientists of this province, and a number of institutions bear his name:

The South-Tyrolean amateur astronomy society Amateurastronomen Max Valier'' and their public astronomical observatory "Max Valier" in Gummer (BZ Italy)
The Technological Institute "Max Valier" in Bolzano, Italy
The Max Valier X-ray telescopic satellite launched in 2017 orbits the earth transmitting Morse Code on 145.96MHz and 437.325MHz.

References 

 Data pages, Historic American Engineering Record for the Marshall Space Flight Center, United States Library of Congress

External links
 

1895 births
1930 deaths
People from Bolzano
People from the County of Tyrol
Austrian inventors
Austrian male writers
Austrian physicists
Early spaceflight scientists
German spaceflight pioneers
Austro-Hungarian military personnel of World War I
University of Innsbruck alumni
19th-century male writers
Burials at the Westfriedhof (Munich)
Inventors killed by their own invention
Austrian emigrants to Germany